Mauricio Affonso Prieto (born 26 January 1992) is an Uruguayan professional footballer who plays as a forward for Uruguayann side River Plate .

Career

Affonso started his career playing for uruguayan side Racing Club in 2012, competing in Primera División. After four years, he moved in Peñarol.

In the pasts five years, Affonso played in diverse countries like Perú, Saudi Arabia and South Africa. In 2021 he signed for River Plate and returned to Uruguayan Primera División.

References

External links
 
 
 

1992 births
Living people
Uruguayan people of Portuguese descent
Uruguayan footballers
Uruguayan expatriate footballers
Uruguayan Primera División players
Saudi Professional League players
Argentine Primera División players
Peruvian Primera División players
Racing Club de Montevideo players
Al-Shabab FC (Riyadh) players
Peñarol players
Atlético Tucumán footballers
Club Alianza Lima footballers
Mamelodi Sundowns F.C. players
Club Atlético River Plate (Montevideo) players
Expatriate footballers in Saudi Arabia
Expatriate footballers in Argentina
Expatriate footballers in Peru
Expatriate soccer players in South Africa
Uruguayan expatriate sportspeople in Saudi Arabia
Uruguayan expatriate sportspeople in Argentina
Uruguayan expatriate sportspeople in Peru
Uruguayan expatriate sportspeople in South Africa
Association football forwards